Happiness is a 2007 South Korean film, directed by Hur Jin-ho and starring Hwang Jung-min and Im Soo-jung. It is a love story about two people who meet while battling serious illnesses.

Plot
When stricken with a terminal disease, Young-su leaves his careless high life in the city, live-in girlfriend and dwindling business. He retreats to a sanatorium in the countryside in order to treat his illness, where he meets Eun-hee, a young woman who is a resident patient there. Soon they develop feelings for each other and leave the sanatorium together to live in a small but cozy farm house. Their health improves dramatically but when Young-su's friends from the city come for a visit, he starts to wonder if he should abandon mundane rural village and return to his former lifestyle.

Cast
Hwang Jung-min as Young-soo
Im Soo-jung as Eun-hee
Kim Ki-chun as Boo-nam
Yoo Seung-mok as Chae-gon
Lee Jae-hun as Suk-woo
Seo Jin-suk as Jin-suk
Kim Jin-goo as Young-soo's mother
Joo Boo-jin as doctor
Min Kyung-jin as truck driver
Oh Seo-won as medicine doctor
Kim Chang-sub as waiter
Kim In-sook as Mi-young
Gong Hyo-jin as Soo-yeon 
Ryu Seung-soo as Dong-joon
Park In-hwan as Suk-goo (cameo)
Shin Shin-ae as The director of a nursing home (cameo)

Awards and nominations
2007 Blue Dragon Film Awards
 Best Director - Hur Jin-ho
 Nomination - Best Film
 Nomination - Best Actor - Hwang Jung-min
 Nomination - Best Actress - Im Soo-jung
 Nomination - Best Screenplay - Hur Jin-ho, Lee Suk-yeon, Seo Yoo-min and Shin Joon-ho
 Nomination - Best Cinematography - Kim Hyung-koo
 Nomination - Best Lighting - Jung Young-min
 Nomination - Best Music - Jo Seong-woo

2007 Korean Association of Film Critics Awards
 Best Screenplay - Hur Jin-ho, Lee Suk-yeon, Seo Yoo-min and Shin Joon-ho

2007 Korean Film Awards
 Best Supporting Actress - Gong Hyo-jin
 Nomination - Best Film
 Nomination - Best Director - Hur Jin-ho

2008 Asian Film Awards
 Nomination - Best Supporting Actress - Gong Hyo-jin

2008 Baeksang Arts Awards
 Nomination - Best Film
 Nomination - Best Actress - Im Soo-jung

2008 Buil Film Awards
 Nomination - Best Director - Hur Jin-ho
 Nomination - Best Actress - Im Soo-jung
 Nomination - Best Cinematography - Kim Hyung-koo

2008 Grand Bell Awards
 Nomination - Best Film
 Nomination - Best Director - Hur Jin-ho
 Nomination - Best Actor - Hwang Jung-min
 Nomination - Best Actress - Im Soo-jung
 Nomination - Best Supporting Actress - Gong Hyo-jin
 Nomination - Best Screenplay - Hur Jin-ho, Lee Suk-yeon, Seo Yoo-min and Shin Joon-ho
 Nomination - Best Cinematography - Kim Hyung-koo

References

External links 
 
 
 

2007 films
2007 romantic drama films
2000s Korean-language films
Films directed by Hur Jin-ho
Showbox films
South Korean romantic drama films
2000s South Korean films